The following lists the top 100 singles of 1999 in Australia from the Australian Recording Industry Association (ARIA) End of Year singles chart.

"Mambo No. 5" by Lou Bega was the biggest song of the year, peaking at #1 for eight weeks and staying in the top 50 for 17 weeks. The longest stay at #1 was by Britney Spears with "...Baby One More Time" which spent 9 weeks at the top spot.

Notes

References

Australian record charts
1999 in Australian music
1999 record charts